Jammu Lok Sabha constituency is one of the five Lok Sabha (parliamentary) constituencies in Jammu and Kashmir union territory of in northern India. This constituency was created in 1967.

Previous Assembly segments
Jammu Lok Sabha constituency is composed of the following assembly segments:
 Samba (SC) (assembly constituency no. 68)
 Vijaypur (assembly constituency no. 69)
 Nagrota (assembly constituency no. 70)
 Gandhinagar (assembly constituency no. 71)
 Jammu East (assembly constituency no. 72)
 Jammu West (assembly constituency no. 73)
 Bishnah (assembly constituency no. 74)
 Ranbir Singh Pura (assembly constituency no. 75)
Suchetgarh (assembly constituency no. 76)
Marh (assembly constituency no. 77)
Raipur Domana (SC) (assembly constituency no. 78)
Akhnoor (assembly constituency no. 79)
Chhamb (SC) (assembly constituency no. 80)
Nowshera (assembly constituency no. 81)
Darhal (assembly constituency no. 82)
Rajouri (assembly constituency no. 83)
Kalakot (assembly constituency no. 84)
Surankote (assembly constituency no. 85)
Mendhar (assembly constituency no. 86)
Poonch-Haveli (assembly constituency no. 87)

New Assembly segments

Members of Parliament

^ by poll

Election results

General elections 2019

General elections 2014

General elections 2009

See also
 Jammu district
 Poonch district
 Rajouri district
 Samba district
 Ladakh Lok Sabha constituency
 List of Constituencies of the Lok Sabha

References

External links
Jammu lok sabha  constituency election 2019 date and schedule

Lok Sabha constituencies in Jammu and Kashmir
Jammu district
Rajouri district
Poonch district, India
Samba district